Yamón District is one of seven districts of the province Utcubamba in Peru.

References

1861 establishments in Peru
Districts of the Utcubamba Province
Districts of the Amazonas Region